Roy Gulwak is a goalkeeper for FC Kator. He is a member of the South Sudan national team. Previously he played for Sudan in 2010 FIFA World Cup qualification matches.

References

1985 births
Living people
Association football goalkeepers
Sudan international footballers
South Sudan international footballers
South Sudanese footballers
Dual internationalists (football)
Al-Hilal Club (Omdurman) players
Al Khartoum SC players
People from Juba